Lake Dora is a  lake and also short-lived mining area of the late 1890s located in the West Coast Range of Western Tasmania, Australia.

Features and location
It has two adjacent tarns just west of it, Maxfield and Michael Tarns, and numerous unnamed smaller lakes and water features.

Located east of the Mount Tyndall area, it was the site of a transient gold-mining rush in the late 1890s. Lake Dora is not generally accessible by road, but only via trails or by helicopter. Lake Dora lies north of Lake Spicer – into which it drains.

Charles Whitham wrote of the mining rush:
Lake Dora, Royal Dora, Lady Dora, North Dora, and, of course Dora Reward. The Government put in a good track from Mount Read, with a telephone line (1897).

See also

List of reservoirs and dams in Tasmania
List of lakes in Tasmania

References

Further reading
 

Dora
West Coast Range